Astra Zarina (August 25, 1929 – August 31, 2008) was an architect and professor in the University of Washington Department of Architecture.  She is best known for her creation of the University of Washington Italian Studies programs and her founding of the UW Rome Center.

Biography 
Zarina was born in Riga, Latvia.  She came to the United States with her family after World War II and matriculated at the University of Washington in 1947.  In the UW architecture program she studied under faculty including Lionel Pries, Wendell Lovett, and Victor Steinbrueck. She completed her B.Arch. in 1953.  After graduation she worked in the office of Paul Hayden Kirk and married architecture classmate Douglas Haner (1930–2011).

Zarina moved to Boston in 1954 and entered the architecture program at MIT;  her husband enrolled at Harvard. At MIT, her thesis focused on retail design in Boston.  Zarina and Haner both graduated in 1955 with M.Arch. degrees and went to work in the office of Minoru Yamasaki outside Detroit.

In 1960, Zarina won the American Academy in Rome Fellowship in Architecture;  she was the first woman to be awarded the Academy's architecture fellowship.  She subsequently won a Fulbright fellowship for study and travel in Italy.  Zarina and Haner subsequently divorced.

Zarina first taught at the University of Washington in a part-time position in the mid-1960s.  In 1970, in coordination with Architecture Department Chair, Professor Thomas Bosworth, Zarina hosted the first program in Rome for architecture students.  Her first students included Steven Holl, Ed Weinstein and John Ullman.  The Rome Program subsequently became a regular offering of the Department.  Zarina was eventually appointed as an Associate Professor and she later became a professor.

In the late 1960s, Zarina, and second husband Anthony Costa Heywood, also an architect, began working on the restoration of the ancient Italian hilltown of Civita di Bagnoregio, located 60 miles north of Rome.

In 1960, Professor Zarina was awarded the American Academy in Rome Fellowship in Architecture, the first in the Academy's history to be awarded to a woman in that field, together with a Fulbright grant for study in Italy.

In 1976, Zarina taught the first summer program on Italian Hilltowns based in Civita di Bagnoregio.

1976 also saw publication of her book, co-authored with Balthazar Korab, on Rome's roofscapes, I tetti di Roma: Le terrazze, le altane, i belvedere.  In 1979 Zarina received the University of Washington Distinguished Teaching Award.

In the early 1980s, working with Gordon Varey, Dean of the College of Architecture and Urban Planning (now College of Built Environments),  Zarina developed the idea for a permanent facility in Rome.  By 1984 the Rome Center was established in the Palazzo Pio, located near the center of Rome.  Zarina was director of the Rome Center until the mid-1990s.  The UW Rome Center continues to house the Architecture in Rome programs, but also hosts programs from many other University of Washington departments and from other American architecture schools.

Zarina retired from teaching about the year 2000.  She lived her last years in Civita, continuing to promote its restoration.  She died there in August 2008.

Awards 
 American Academy in Rome Fellowship
 Fulbright fellowship

References

External links
 American Academy in Rome, Society of Fellows
 MIT thesis on DSpace

1929 births
2008 deaths
Architects from Riga
University of Washington College of Built Environments alumni
MIT School of Architecture and Planning alumni
University of Washington faculty
Architects from Seattle
Latvian emigrants to the United States
Latvian World War II refugees
20th-century American architects
American women architects
20th-century American women
American women academics
21st-century American women